Corythucha aesculi is a species of lace bug Tingidae native to North America. C. aesculi'''s host plant is the yellow buckeye, (Aesculus octandra) Marsh and the insect can attain very high densities. C. aesculi'' is preyed upon by a wide variety of other insects, of which ladybugs seem to be the most important.

References

Tingidae
Hemiptera of North America